Titicus Reservoir is a reservoir located in the Town of North Salem in Westchester County, 30 miles (48 km) north of New York City. One of twelve in the NYC water supply's Croton Watershed, it has been supplying the system since 1893.

At full capacity it holds 7.2 billion gallons (2.7 million m³). It is 681.5 acres (2.7 km²) in area, two miles (3.2 km) long, reaches a mean depth of 32 feet (9.8 m) and drains a 24-square mile (62.4 km²) area in North Salem and Lewisboro.  The Titicus River, which feeds the east end of the reservoir, begins more than five miles away in Ridgefield, Connecticut; it drains much of northern Ridgefield and Ridgebury, Connecticut.

Water from the reservoir goes first along the Titicus to the Muscoot Reservoir, then into New Croton Reservoir and finally along the 24-mile (38.6-km) New Croton Aqueduct to the Jerome Park Reservoir in the Bronx, where it becomes part of the city's daily draw.

See also

List of reservoirs and dams in New York

References

External links

Croton Watershed
Reservoirs in Westchester County, New York
Reservoirs in New York (state)
Protected areas of Westchester County, New York